is an action-adventure hack and slash video game developed by PlatinumGames and published by Konami. It was released for the PlayStation 3 and Xbox 360 in 2013, Windows and OS X in 2014 and Nvidia Shield TV in 2016. It is a spin-off in the Metal Gear series, set four years after the events of Metal Gear Solid 4: Guns of the Patriots. In the game, the player controls Raiden, a cyborg who confronts the private military company Desperado Enforcement, with the gameplay focusing on fighting enemies using a sword and other weapons to perform combos and counterattacks. Through the use of Blade Mode, Raiden can cut cyborgs in slow motion and steal parts stored in their bodies. The series' usual stealth elements are also optional to reduce combat.

The game was originally being developed internally by Kojima Productions, who announced the game in 2009 under the title of Metal Gear Solid: Rising. However, the team met with difficulties in developing a game based on swordplay, so supervising director Hideo Kojima postponed its development until a solution could be found. The project resurfaced in late 2011 under its finalized title, with PlatinumGames as the new developer. The game underwent significant changes in its play mechanics and storyline under PlatinumGames' involvement, although Kojima Productions retained responsibility for the game's overall plot and Raiden's design.

Upon its worldwide release in February 2013, Metal Gear Rising: Revengeance was well received by critics, being praised for its sophisticated cutting system, its use of Metal Gear elements to complement the story despite the game's focus on action, its soundtrack, and its boss fights; some criticism was directed at its camera mechanics and the short length of the story mode. The game also enjoyed positive sales, with the PS3 and Steam versions selling an estimated total of more than  copies. While those involved in the game's production have expressed desire to develop a sequel, such prospects have yet to come to fruition due to the ensuing conflicts between Konami and Kojima Productions.

Gameplay

Players assume control of Raiden, a katana-wielding cyborg. He is initially playable in his "Standard Body" form, which resembles the body used by Raiden in Metal Gear Solid 4, but with a more natural-looking face. The player can alter Raiden's appearance through alternative skins. Unlike previous titles in the Metal Gear series, where players try not to be noticed by enemies, Rising is action-oriented, focusing on sword fighting and a sophisticated cutting system to fight and defeat enemies. Although Raiden's main weapon is his high-frequency blade, he is not restricted to just that as he can use other replacement blades, sub-weapons or secondary weapons. Raiden can wield sub-weapons such as two kinds of rocket launchers, four kinds of grenades, the iconic cardboard box, an oil drum, and a 3D photo frame. Otherwise, secondary weapons can only be obtained after defeating the game's bosses.

The game's cutting system allows players to engage in melee combat, as well as to precisely slash enemies and objects at will along a geometrical plane using the "free slicing" Blade Mode. Virtually any object in the game can be cut, including vehicles and enemies, though elements of the environment were intentionally limited to structures such as pillars and walls to better facilitate the game. Entering Blade Mode produces a special targeting reticule in the form of a transparent blue plane which can be rotated and moved, tracing orange lines across the surfaces of objects to indicate exactly where they will be cut; it can also be used to enter a bullet time state, giving players the opportunity to precisely slash targets during moments of action, such as slicing through a falling target from multiple angles before it hits the ground. These features can be employed strategically, for example disabling opponents, finding weak points and gaps in armor, severing support columns to collapse ceilings or walls onto enemies, deflecting enemy fire, or cutting through objects to remove enemy cover. However, entering into Blade Mode reduces Raiden's energy to the point that if dropped to a certain level, it cannot be used. Throughout the story the player obtains the Ripper Mode, a state which enhances Raiden's power for a limited time facilitating the use of Blade Mode.

Raiden has the ability to parry attacks even when his back is turned, allowing him to counterattack enemies and perform multiple combos. The player also has access to a stealth mode called "Ninja Run" which drastically increases Raiden's speed and allows him to climb certain areas. This allows him to strategically ambush an enemy rather than fighting head to head. Another key feature is called , and involves "cutting" through enemies and "taking" parts, energy, ammunition, items, and information from the bodies of dismembered cyborgs and robots. This maneuver can be employed when attacking an enemy during Blade Mode and helps Raiden gain energy. When completing a mission, the player will be rewarded with a specific number of points depending on their performance and will receive a grade, with the highest being "S". These points allow them to buy upgrades for Raiden's equipment.

The player can carry out reconnaissance using a visor. Through this, the player can verify the areas and proceed to the objective avoiding contact with enemies. Hiding in a cardboard box makes sneaking easier for Raiden. Being spotted by an enemy triggers the "Alert Mode", in which Raiden is assaulted by multiple enemies for a determined time. The player also gains assistance from Blade Wolf, a canine-like UG that scouts and gathers map information and intel for Raiden.

Synopsis

Setting and characters

The events of Metal Gear Rising are set in the year 2018, four years after the events of Metal Gear Solid 4: Guns of the Patriots. The Patriots, a powerful shadow organization running the world's war economy, have been destroyed and Private Military Companies (PMC) have splintered into numerous factions. With the elimination of the Patriot-controlled nanomachine technology used to regulate soldiers' abilities, PMCs turn to advanced cyborg technology, creating durable superhuman soldiers. The player controls Raiden (Quinton Flynn), a former child soldier turned into a cyborg that now works for the PMC Maverick Security Consulting, Inc. Raiden is supported by his Maverick colleagues, Russian pointman Boris Popov (JB Blanc), military advisor Kevin Washington (Phil LaMarr), computer specialist Courtney Collins (Kari Wahlgren), and cybernetics expert Wilhelm "Doktor" Voight (Jim Ward). Returning from Metal Gear Solid 4 is Sunny Emmerich (Cristina Pucelli), a child prodigy and friend of Raiden working at Solis Space & Aeronautics.

Rival PMC Desperado Enforcement LLC. serve as the game's main antagonists; Desperado wants to destabilize peaceful nations and preserve conflict, allowing them to reap the financial rewards and technological advancements of the war economy. Desperado operative Samuel Rodrigues (Philip Anthony-Rodriguez), also known as Jetstream Sam, serves as Raiden's rival with a conversation between the two in the beginning influencing Raiden. Sam is a member of a team of Desperado cyborg assassins named the "Winds of Destruction": Sundowner (Crispin Freeman), Desperado's de facto leader, who wields "Bloodlust", machetes that combine in a large pincer, and who also has a set of reactive armor shields connected to his body; Mistral (Salli Saffioti), the team's only female member, whose frame can support multiple additional arms, allowing her to wield her "L'Etranger" staff that she can use as a whip or halberd; and Monsoon (John Kassir), who uses dual sai called "Dystopia", can manipulate metal objects with magnetism, and can break apart his body into individual components while retaining control over each part through magnetism. LQ-84i, later redesignated as Blade Wolf (Michael Beattie), is a state-of-the-art Artificial Intelligence (AI) housed within a quadruped robot who serves initially as Raiden's Desperado-controlled enemy, but it is later reprogrammed to aid Raiden and Maverick. Additionally, a Colorado senator and potential Presidential candidate, Steven Armstrong (Alastair Duncan), is involved in Desperado's activities. An additional member of the Winds of Destruction, Khamsin (Benito Martinez), appears as part of the Blade Wolf DLC campaign. The game is a spin-off that is "not part of the Metal Gear Solid series", although series creator Hideo Kojima said it is a parallel continuation.

Plot
While providing security detail in an unnamed African country for its prime minister, N'Mani, Raiden and his team are attacked by rogue PMC Desperado. While Raiden fends off their forces, their leader Sundowner kidnaps and executes N'Mani. Raiden is badly wounded in a duel with Sundowner's comrade, Jetstream Sam, but Boris saves him as Desperado escapes. Doktor later upgrades Raiden with more powerful cyborg armor.

Three weeks later, Raiden infiltrates the breakaway nation of Abkhazia after learning that Desperado is leading a military coup there. He plans to capture Andrey Dolzaev, an extremist leading the Abkhazian forces, to force Desperado into standing down. Desperado anticipates the move and assigns a prototype AI designated LQ-84i to stop him. Raiden defeats LQ-84i in combat and later has it rebuilt as an ally, naming it Blade Wolf. He faces further opposition from Mistral, the commander of Desperado's forces in Abkhazia. After Raiden kills Mistral in combat, Dolzaev commits suicide by blowing up an oil tank he is standing on. Maverick assigns Raiden and Blade Wolf to investigate a research facility in Guadalajara, Mexico. There, Raiden meets an orphan named George, who was brought to the facility to have his brain—along with the brains of several other orphans—surgically removed and shipped to the United States. He learns that Sundowner inspected the facility in the company of Senator Steven Armstrong, creating an alliance between Desperado and World Marshal, another PMC. They plan to condition the children's brains to become killers through VR training and place them inside cybernetic bodies to create new soldiers, similar to Raiden. Raiden rescues George and the unharvested orphans and takes them to Doktor.

Raiden resigns and, with Blade Wolf at his side, launches a one-man assault on World Marshal's headquarters in Denver, Colorado. Though no longer employed by them, Maverick unofficially provides discreet support throughout. As he fights his way through the city's privatized police force and Desperado soldiers, Raiden becomes conflicted over those he has killed. He begins regressing towards his aggressive child soldier persona, "Jack the Ripper", before finally embracing it when he encounters Sam and another operative named Monsoon. He kills Monsoon and infiltrates World Marshal's headquarters before locating and killing Sundowner. There, he learns that Armstrong brought World Marshal and Desperado together to exploit Raiden's desire to avenge N'Mani's death. Armstrong used Desperado to distract Raiden while he carries out "Operation Tecumseh": a plan to assassinate the President of the United States during peace negotiations with Pakistan to ensure another war on terror.

While Doktor recovers the children's brains, Raiden seeks help from Solis Space & Aeronautics to reach Pakistan in time to stop Armstrong. He encounters Sam on the way and the pair engage in a final duel from which Raiden emerges victorious. At Solis, Sunny helps Raiden travel to Shabhazabad Air Base in Pakistan, where he is attacked by Metal Gear EXCELSUS, a hexapedal tank piloted by Armstrong. He reveals that Operation Tecumseh was a false flag operation, and his true plan was to frame Desperado for killing the United States military personnel at the base, as this is enough to agitate the American people. Armstrong, with his connections to the PMCs, would win any subsequent election in a landslide, giving him free rein to realize his vision of a social Darwinist society, fighting and dying only for what they believe in. Raiden destroys EXCELSUS but discovers that Armstrong has augmented himself with nanomachines that give him incredible strength and near-invulnerability, destroying Raiden's high-frequency blade. Blade Wolf intervenes and gives Raiden Sam's sword, which allows him to defeat and kill Armstrong.

In the epilogue, Maverick receives approval to create a new cyborg staffing firm, allowing them to shelter the orphans' brains and potentially give them a chance at a better life, while George and Blade Wolf go live at Solis with Sunny. Although Desperado is defeated and the brain-taking operation defunct, World Marshal remains in business. Raiden decides against rejoining Maverick, resolving to fight his own war.

Development

As Metal Gear Solid: Rising 

After Metal Gear Solid 4: Guns of the Patriots was released, Hideo Kojima started coming up with ideas for another Metal Gear game. The game was meant to feature The Boss and her comrades, the Cobra Unit, as main characters. However, the lack of experience from the younger staff in charge and the lack of involvement from Kojima resulted in this project being scrapped. Afterwards, a member suggested turning it into a sidestory focused on Raiden since said character was featured in Guns of the Patriots and the staff agreed to develop Metal Gear Solid: Rising. It was originally conceived to chronicle the series of events that resulted in the transformation of Raiden into his cyborg ninja persona in Metal Gear Solid 4. Rising would have taken place during a point in the series' chronology at which Raiden had already begun his transformation into cyborg form, albeit with a different and somewhat more crude appearance from the one seen in Metal Gear Solid 4.

The game was first hinted during Kojima's keynote presentation at the 2009 Game Developers Conference in San Francisco where the presentation's end showed "The Next MGS" with Raiden as a cyborg standing next to the title. Prior to the announcements of the game, Kojima Productions featured a countdown timer on their website until the day that Rising was announced. The series' traditional tagline of "Tactical Espionage Action" was also altered to "Lightning Bolt Action," a play on the fact that Raiden's name is Japanese for "thunder and lightning." The game was officially announced at E3 2009 at the Microsoft press conference. A teaser trailer was released by Kojima, although he would be serving only as executive producer for the game, as all of his input was with Metal Gear Solid: Peace Walker. The game was initially only announced for the Xbox 360 but was later confirmed for the PS3 and Windows platforms. It would use a brand new game engine, rather than the Metal Gear Solid 4 engine.

The game's original cover artwork was leaked on Xbox Live on June 10, four days before E3 2010. During Microsoft's E3 press conference on June 14, Kojima introduced the game's original lead designer, Mineshi Kimura, who unveiled a new trailer which included cutscene and playing footage. The game's creative producer, Shigenobu Matsuyama, and Kimura again presented the trailer on June 16 during Konami's E3 press conference, then took stage, further clarifying the game's mechanic. Concern had risen over the game's realistic depictions of human dismemberment during player-controlled sequences, a hard limit for Japan's Computer Entertainment Rating Organization, which may necessitate censorship in the domestic Japanese release of the game. As a result, the version of the E3 2010 trailer available for viewing on the game's official Japanese website has had such scenes removed.

Kimura stated that Rising would carry on the series tradition of encouraging players to progress through the game without killing, noting that there is a moral difference between attacking cyborgs or robots and attacking human beings, and that there is a "certain virtue to simply disabling your enemies instead of killing them." While it was considered important to give the players freedom Matsuyama indicated that players would never be rewarded for killing human opponents, and that the game would be designed so that players would never be forced to do so. Specifically, the game's stealth elements would have emphasized Raiden's considerable speed and agility through what Matsuyama describes as "hunting stealth." Unlike the stealth of previous titles, in which players remained hidden and avoided combat, players in Rising would instead quickly stalk their enemies and use acrobatic maneuvers to stay out of sight while closing in. This ties in with the game's zan-datsu feature, allowing them to prey upon enemies to obtain weapons, items, and energy. Kimura noted that he wanted Raiden to be able to move like he did in the Metal Gear Solid 4 trailers, and to show "the stealth of the sword, and the strength of not even losing to the gun, and the fear and power you have with this blade."

At TGS 2010, Sony announced that the PS3 version of Metal Gear Solid: Rising would be playable in 3D. In January 2011, several pieces of concept art for Rising were displayed at Yoji Shinkawa's two-week exhibit, The Art of Yoji Shinkawa, hosted by the Konami Style Shop in Tokyo. During late 2011, it was announced over that Matsuyama had moved to a different division within Konami and that Yuji Korekado had taken over as the game's lead producer. Additionally, Kojima said Metal Gear Solid: Rising is "moving forward"; Kojima had stated the game remains significantly different from existing Metal Gear games, although he has retained an element of control over it and will not let it stray too far from the series' roots. He advised fans to try it even though the game would not focus on stealth.

Move to PlatinumGames

Despite having thought out stories and scenarios for the game, Kojima Productions were finding it difficult to design the game around the cutting concept. The project was quietly cancelled in late 2010, and whilst Kojima had considered moving the project to developers abroad, he felt that a Japanese developer would be more suited to produce a ninja action game. In early 2011, Kojima met PlatinumGames' Atsushi Inaba who asked him about the state of Metal Gear Solid: Rising and Kojima later requested them to work in the game. This new version, titled Metal Gear Rising: Revengeance, was first revealed via a trailer shown at the Spike Video Game Awards on December 10, 2011. PlatinumGames requested a change of setting in order to have less restrictions in the creation of the game. Shortly after starting development, PlatinumGames discarded the stealth element, with Kojima noting that the original staff did not find it fit with high speed action. However, they were incorporated as Inaba found the original game system too "dull." Artist Yoji Shinkawa worked in the game but only to design Raiden, while freelancer artist Kenichirou Yoshimura is the character designer whose objective is making his work fit with Shinkawa's style.

The first trailer confirmed that Raiden would once again be voiced by Quinton Flynn, who had previously stated that Konami had not contacted him regarding the game. The game's title was changed to Metal Gear Rising: Revengeance with "Revengeance" coming from Kojima Productions' desire "to get revenge or vengeance on the original failed Metal Gear Solid: Rising project" while the stating "Rising" represents Raiden's character. Kojima also confirmed Rising would run at 60 frames per second, a requirement he personally requested of PlatinumGames. The rewrite of the game's script took two months for Kojima Productions to make, in contrast to the original one which took ten months, with the scriptwriter being Etsu Tamari. Tamari often discussed with director Santo when the two studios had different opinions regarding the story. The plot was written with the idea of being accessible to people who have not played previous Metal Gear games. There was also a need to reduce the length of cutscenes so that it would balance the playing time. However, no part of the script was removed in the process. Human soldiers were removed from the game to avoid censorship issues in Japan.

Konami's Martin Scheider assured the game was "in safe hands" owing to the collaboration between Metal Gear veteran Yuji Korekado and Inaba, the former supervising the game. As in the original scrapped version Korekado stated that the staff's objective is to make Raiden's action scenes from Metal Gear Solid 4 playable. Kojima Productions originally planned to release Metal Gear Rising: Revengeance in Japan without a Japanese voice localization but in August 2012, it was revealed the game would have Japanese audio confirming new and returning actors. The first Japanese language trailer was released shortly afterwards. Inaba had stated that the PS3 version would be the lead platform. The decision was made in order to avoid a repeat of the performance issues that Bayonetta had on the console.

The game was playable for the first time in the E3 2012 during early June with Kojima having been involved on its making. In promoting the game, during April 2012 Konami sent a replica of Raiden's severed arm to various video game publications. The arm contained a small teaser from the game in the form of a live-action scene. In following weeks, the official Metal Gear Rising website started showing a longer version of the scene as well as new ones. Konami noticed people asking multiple questions regarding these teasers to which they responded that answers would be delivered during E3. The teasers are meant to give a few hints regarding the game's plot and none of the footage is to be used in it.

Music
The game's score was composed by Jamie Christopherson, with additional music by Graeme Cornies, Brian Pickett, James Chapple, and David Kelly, and directed by Naoto Tanaka. As a result of the game being focused on action rather than stealth like the previous Metal Gear games, the music has a different style. Director Kenji Saito proposed the idea of heavy and fast music featuring lyrics to Kojima Productions. When the studio accepted Saito's idea, the two developers started working together to make the music. Christopherson also contributed by writing thirteen vocal songs which includes electronic music. The soundtrack features vocals by artists including John Bush, Tyson Yen, Free Dominguez, Jason C. Miller and Jimmy Gnecco with contributions by Logan Mader, former member of Machine Head, Electronic Rock Musicians/Remixers The Maniac Agenda, and Ferry Corsten. A soundtrack featuring themes from the game was featured in the limited edition. Another soundtrack, titled Metal Gear Rising Revengeance Vocal Tracks, featuring 29 tracks, was released on February 20, 2013.

Release
The demo version was initially released as a bonus included in the Zone of the Enders: HD Collection, which was released for the PlayStation 3 and Xbox 360 on October 30, 2012. A public demo of Metal Gear Rising: Revengeance was released in Japan on December 13, 2012, on the PlayStation Store. The North American demo was later released on the Xbox Live Marketplace and PlayStation Store on January 22, 2013.

The full version was released in North America on February 19, 2013, and in Europe on February 21 for the PlayStation 3 and Xbox 360 consoles. Although it was also planned to be released for both consoles on February 21 in Australia, shipping issues delayed it to February 26. The game was released in Japan on February 21 for the PlayStation 3, with the Xbox 360 release cancelled. While a Windows version of Metal Gear Solid: Rising was initially planned, release for this platform was put on hold. However, Kojima Productions said they would consider it after the release of the console versions. The Windows version was then announced in May 2013, and released on January 9, 2014. The PlayStation 3 version has been added to the library of PlayStation Plus subscribers in November 2013.

In Japan, Konami released two collectors' editions. The first one, "Premium Package", contains an artbook by Yoji Shinkawa, and a soundtrack package. The second limited edition is the "Premium Package Special Edition" including all the contents from the other one with the addition of an action figure of Raiden. The English collector's edition features a soundtrack, a steel case and a lamp containing a small-scale replica of Raiden's sword. An exclusive download edition titled the Ultimate Edition was released on the PlayStation Network on May 21, 2013. This edition includes the full game, plus all the downloadable contents. The same version was released in stores with the label of Special Edition on December 5, 2013, in Japan.

The Windows version was released on January 9, 2014. The version briefly required online connection until a fix was issued on January 10, 2014. It was claimed that the requirement was an accidental bug. The Windows version has been region locked making the game unavailable in India and Japan. The game was briefly unavailable for purchase in Ireland. The game is also not available for purchase through Steam in Malaysia, but is available in disc format for the PlayStation 3. The game also has region locked serials and cross-region gifting. In March 2015, Metal Gear Rising: Revengeance was confirmed to be coming to the Nvidia Shield Console. In January 2017, the OS X version of Revengeance became unplayable due to an issue with its DRM after Transgaming, who developed the port, went out of business.

Downloadable content
The downloadable content for Rising consists of five cyborg body types for Raiden, a set of VR Missions, and two story-based campaigns starring a different character each. The DLC armors were available as pre-order incentives through different participating retailers that varied between region. The VR Missions set and bonus campaigns were made available during the months following the game's release. All the downloadable content has since been made available for general users on PlayStation Network and Xbox Live and are included as standard features in the Windows version of the game.

Body types

Campaigns

Reception

Pre-release
Eurogamer, 1UP.com and VideoGamer.com listed it as one of the most anticipated games of 2012 because it distances itself from previous games in the franchise as well as considering PlatinumGames' previous work. However, a common criticism echoed by IGN's Richard George has been that its style contrasts sharply with the previous Metal Gear games as a result of the change of developers and player character Raiden. David Houghton of GamesRadar noted that Raiden's actions during play were not out of character considering his role in Metal Gear Solid 4: Guns of the Patriots where he was able to fight soldiers without his arms. During the E3 2012, both GameSpot editors Kevin VanOrd and Peter Brown were surprised with the gameplay provided by the demo, with the former calling it "fluid third-person action featuring slow-motion swordplay" in place of the stealth style featured in the Metal Gear Solid series. Both writers still found Raiden suitable for the game's style and plot owing to his role in previous Metal Gear games. 1UP's Jose Otero provided similar comments, praising the gameplay's style, but still felt the demo was more like a tutorial rather than a stage of game.

Producer Atsushi Inaba took to his Twitter feed to address fans' concerns over the project. He acknowledged the mixed reaction to the unveiling of Rising, but hopes gamers will spot "a glimpse of the future" in the trailer. Inaba promises its "love and respect will shine through." The negative reactions came from fans noticing the genre switching to a "hack and slash" game. Inaba expressed his dismay at the fans' comparison of Metal Gear Rising with Ninja Gaiden 3, having criticized the latter game. During Games Convention 2012, Kojima Productions noted the demos were well received by fans due to the number of attendees that wanted to play it. They added that feedback for the demo was positive. In September 2012, Metal Gear Rising: Revengeance was one of the winners from Computer Entertainment Supplier's Association's Japan Game Awards.

Post-release

Metal Gear Rising: Revengeance received "generally favorable" reviews, according to review aggregator Metacritic. Famitsu scored the game a near perfect 39 out of 40. Play and GamesTM also shared positive impressions, with the latter calling Metal Gear Rising "almost certainly the best Metal Gear game released this generation."

Eurogamer writer Rich Stanton was pleased with the creation of this Metal Gear spin-off expanding the franchise. It was noted that the game was close to receiving a perfect 10 were it not for issues with the camera. Other sites noted similar issues during their reviews due to the fact it could not keep up with the fast action sequences. The game's action was praised by several publications, stating it would be appealing for casual players and Metal Gear fans. Bob Mackey enjoyed the game but felt that the game still had the mark of a "rescued product": "Revengeance isn't Platinum at the top of their game; it's the studio making the best of a bad situation -- even so, a troubled Platinum production still has plenty to offer." Some focused on the cutting system which allowed players to slice not only enemies but also the environment, while IGN's Mitch Dyer commented on how the number of subweapons improved the game's variety despite a lack of flow when changing them. Boss fights have also been referred as one of the game's strongest points due to its use of cutscenes and music.

On the other hand, Joe Juba from Game Informer was less favourable, stating that the combat was the only real highlight of the game, reserved about the superficiality of even the combat element itself, commenting "[the combat] is entertaining, but 'style over substance' is the defining theme." He found that the game's shortcomings made it less interesting than previous Metal Gear games and Bayonetta, a video game also by PlatinumGames. Computer and Video Games Matt Gilman agreed with Juba, adding that the game's cons, while annoying, could have been easily fixed, citing the lack of a defense action rather than parrying. The campaign has also been criticized for a short running time although Miguel Concepción from The Escapist cited the multiple challenging difficulties as a way to encourage the players to play through the game more than once in order to increase the number of hours the player can do.

The plot was found to be on par with other games in the franchise. Raiden's role and development were found to be appealing, with GameSpot's Peter Brown praising his violent attitude that made him an outstanding anti-hero, whereas GameTrailers noted how Raiden contrasted his Metal Gear Solid 2: Sons of Liberty persona that had been criticized back in 2001. IGN wrote that fans of Metal Gear Solid 4 would enjoy the game more because Raiden can replicate his moves from that game's cutscenes in gameplay. Eurogamer said a major change in Raiden's characterization is Revengeance, referring to him as a "the ultimate cyborg and also the ultimate killer" based on his darker persona that is explored in combat. Critics praised the design of the game's bosses, while Samuel was noted to have a good rivalry with Raiden that helped develop the latter. Despite being a spin-off and lacking the series' protagonist Solid Snake, Concepción found the setting post Metal Gear Solid 4: Guns of the Patriots to contain several classic Metal Gear elements that old players would find familiar. However, Game Informer criticized the new characters as "uninteresting and poorly developed".

Producer Atsushi Inaba noted on his Twitter account that several Western gamers believed the game was too short based on a results screen that showed a clear time of five-and-a-half hours. He clarified that the screen did not count cutscenes or failed attempts to beat the game, taking in account only the times the player passes the stages. This system has been used by PlatinumGames since Bayonetta in order to evaluate players. As a result, Inaba felt disappointed by people's attempts to criticize the game based on a single screen.

Sales
PlatinumGames' president Tatsuya Minami said he expects good sales from the game due to strong marketing and being part of the Metal Gear series. Shortly after its release Hideo Kojima mentioned having been pleased due to Metal Gear Rising: Revengeance selling well around the world but did not share numbers. During its first week, the game topped Japan's Media Create and Enterbrain Japan charts list selling 308,681 units according to the former and 335,791 units according to the latter. Among the Famitsu 2013 Top 100, a listing of the top 100 Japanese retail software sales for the year of 2013 from data collected by Famitsu's parent company Enterbrain, the PS3 version of Metal Gear Rising: Revengeance ranked number 11, with 470,597 physical retail sales within Japan.

The game received a Gold Prize from the 2013 PlayStation Awards, for the PS3 version selling more than 500,000 units in Asia. During its debut in the United Kingdom, it was the second-best-selling game following Crysis 3. , Steam Spy estimated that the PC version sold approximately 722,000 units on Steam, for an estimated total of more than  copies sold for the PS3 and Steam platforms.

Legacy
Hideo Kojima mentioned in January 2012 that depending on the game's popularity, the staff would make a franchise based on it. He has viewed the relationship between Kojima Productions and PlatinumGames as very positive and suggested that a sequel to Metal Gear Rising may be possible in the near future. However, Kojima would only approve of a sequel if PlatinumGames were to develop it, stating that "no one else could [do] it". Following the game's release Kojima was impressed with PlatinumGames' work in the game stating the franchise had a "lot of hugely, insanely critical fans" who would be harsh on reflecting issues. As the original project from the game was telling Raiden's life before Metal Gear Solid 4: Guns of the Patriots Kojima would like the game to be developed although he thought that PlatinumGames would have problems with it as a result of being an inter-sequel. As a result, he is unable to confirm such story could be developed in the future.

On February 22, 2013, Hideo Kojima told SPOnG that he would like to make a sequel of Metal Gear Rising. He said that if it does happen, he would like PlatinumGames to develop it. Kojima also stated that he would like the sequel to star Gray Fox and have him battle "nano machine-powered zombies." He went on to say that he offered to write the story himself, but PlatinumGames did not seem interested. Etsu Tamari, chief story writer for both Metal Gear Rising and the original Metal Gear Solid: Rising has expressed interest in re-using the original idea into the potential sequel.

In August 2013, Konami posted a survey for Metal Gear Rising in their official site asking fans if they want a sequel and if so what they would like to see in it. On January 31, 2015, a trailer for upcoming PS4 games at the 2015 Taipei Game Show teased a brief image of the number 2, in a similar font design to that of Revengeance. However, Kojima Productions later made statements that the "2" was unrelated to the Metal Gear franchise.

Writer Etsu Tamari expressed joy in the final product and expected that in the future, the team could make another game focused on Raiden. Quinton Flynn stated he was pleased with Raiden's role in Revengeance and stated he would have liked a new sequel with him as the lead. However, the ongoing conflicts between Konami and Kojima Productions left him worried as there might not be another game.

The narrative, characters, and soundtrack were noted to contribute to the game's resurgence in popularity as a result of internet memes, including the handling of politics and characters reacting in comical fashion to set pieces and dialogue, the most prominent example being with main antagonist Senator Armstrong, as well as Jetstream Sam.

Notes

References

External links

2013 video games
Action-adventure games
Amputees in fiction
Android (operating system) games
Brain transplantation in fiction
Censored video games
Cyberpunk video games
Dissociative identity disorder in video games
Hack and slash games
MacOS games
Metal Gear spin-off games
Nanotechnology in fiction
PlatinumGames games
PlayStation 3 games
Propaganda in fiction
Single-player video games
Transhumanism in video games
Video games about cyborgs
Video games about ninja
Video games about revenge
Video games about robots
Video games about suicide
Video games developed in Japan
Video games scored by Jamie Christopherson
Video games set in 2018
Video games set in Africa
Video games set in Colorado
Video games set in Denver
Video games set in Georgia (country)
Video games set in Mexico
Video games set in Pakistan
Video games set in the United States
Video games using Havok
Windows games
Xbox 360 games
Internet memes introduced in 2014